AMI-audio is a Canadian 24-hour English language non-profit audio broadcast television service. AMI-audio offers a variety of content to Canadians who are blind, partially sighted or otherwise print restricted.

AMI-audio produces two daily live programs. Each show features news of the day, technology insights, current events, lifestyle issues, health as well as information directly affecting the blind and partially sighted community. AMI-audio also records and curates a selection of feature articles from top publications read by a team of professional narrators. It is owned by Accessible Media Inc. (formerly known as the National Broadcast Reading Servicethe organization was renamed following the launch of its sister television channel).

AMI-audio is licensed by the Canadian Radio-television and Telecommunications Commission (CRTC), and went on the air in 1990 as VoicePrint. The CRTC licensed AMI-audio as a "must-carry" service in 2001, meaning all digital cable and satellite providers must carry the service. AMI-audio is primarily accessed on the secondary audio program (SAP) of CBC News Network, while some providers carry the service on a separate channel through digital cable. The service is also available on the Internet, through ami.ca.

On March 5, 2012, VoicePrint was renamed AMI-audio. The re-branding is part of a new promotional effort by AMI to unify its services under a single brand for easier cross-promotion with AMI-tv and ami.ca.

Logos

See also
Canal M, a similar (but unaffiliated) service in the French language.

References

External links

AMI.ca
CRTC Decision CRTC 2000-380

Television channels and stations established in 1990
1990 establishments in Canada
24-hour television news channels in Canada
Radio reading services of Canada
Disability mass media
Public radio in Canada